The Hate Speech Act of 2016 is a Japanese law dealing with hate speech. It was enacted on 25 May 2016 by Japan's National Diet. However, it does not ban hate speech and sets no penalty for committing it.

The act was passed in order to comply with a United Nation's, "International Convention on the Elimination of All Forms of Racial Discrimination" that stands for eliminating hate speech from the world.  Since the law does not have a penalty for committing any hateful act or speech, many people oppose the new law.  Other people view that the law is ineffective because it only involves threats to someone's body and threats to people's lives.  The Nippon Ishin no Kai feel that the bill should expand to also include insults.  The Liberal Democratic Party in Japan think that if they were to criminalize hate speech, they would lose their freedom.   Members of the Constitutional Democratic Party of Japan and the Japanese Communist Party have called for the enactment of new legislation in order to further advance the cause. Moving forward it is unclear whether or not Japan will more strictly enforce the Hate Speech Act of 2016.

References

Postwar Japan
Law of Japan
2016 in law
2016 in Japanese politics
Hate crime
Censorship in Japan